Kimtadi (किम्तडी) is a village located in Mahakali municipality 5, Nepal. It mainly consists of Chhetri and Bahun caste.

References 

Geography of Nepal
Darchula District